Héctor Rensonnet (9 March 1925 – 23 April 1998) was an Argentine weightlifter. He competed in the men's middle heavyweight event at the 1952 Summer Olympics.

References

External links
 

1925 births
1998 deaths
Argentine male weightlifters
Olympic weightlifters of Argentina
Weightlifters at the 1952 Summer Olympics
Place of birth missing